Moonrise is the first appearance of the Moon over the Earth's eastern horizon. 

Moonrise may also refer to:

Books 
Moonrise (novel), 2005 novel in the Warriors: The New Prophecy series by Erin Hunter
Moonrise (Wolfson book), a 2003 nonfiction book by Penny Wolfson about her son, who has muscular dystrophy
Moonrise, a 1996 Grand Tour novel by Ben Bova
Moonrise, a Phantom Stallion novel by Terri Farley
Moonrise, a 2004 Snowfall Trilogy novel by Mitchell Smith
Moonrise, a 1996 novel by Anne Stuart
Moonrise, a 1946 novel by Theodore Strauss, which was adapted as a film in 1948

Music 
Moonrise (festival), an annual electronic dance music festival in Baltimore, Maryland, US
Moonrise (Dadawa album) or the title song, 2013
Moonrise (Day6 album), 2017
Moonrise (Loona album), 2008
"Moonrise", a song by Lynsey de Paul from Taste Me... Don't Waste Me, 1974
"Moonrise", a song by Paul McCartney from Ocean's Kingdom, 2011

Other uses 
MoonRise, a proposed NASA robotic mission to the south pole of the Moon
Moonrise, Hernandez, New Mexico, a 1941 Ansel Adams photograph
Moonrise, an 1884 painting by Stanisław Masłowski
Moonrise (film), a 1948 film noir crime film adapted from the 1946 novel by Theodore Strauss